The Army Aboriginal Community Assistance Program (originally called a 'Project') is a program run by Department of Families, Housing, Community Services and Indigenous Affairs (FaHCSIA) and Australian Army to assist remote Indigenous Australian communities.  It is also known as the ATSIC/Army Community Assistance Program and also Exercise SAUNDERS, after Reg Saunders, the first Indigenous Australian to be commissioned as an officer in the Australian Army.

It was announced by Senator John Herron on 14 November 1996.  The first round of AACAP projects occurred between 1997 and 2000.  The second round of projects were delivered between 2001 and 2004.  The program continued in 2005 with projects funded in the 2004 Australian federal budget. The third round of projects were delivered between 2006 and 2009.

By the program's 10 year anniversary, over 100 houses had been constructed and more than $60 million spent on provision of infrastructure including "medical centres, airfields, roads, rubbish tips...[and] sewerage works". Various health services had also been delivered including "men's health programs, dental health screening and pet treatment programs".

Projects are managed through 19th Chief Engineer Works, and are delivered by a range of corps including the Royal Australian Engineers, the Royal Australian Electrical and Mechanical Engineers, Royal Australian Corps of Signals, Royal Australian Army Medical Corps, Royal Australian Army Dental Corps and the Royal Australian Army Educational Corps. The majority of these personnel are drawn from the 17th and 21st Construction Squadrons, and the 21st and 22nd Construction Regiments. Personnel from NORFORCE and the various Land Warfare Centre detachments are also sometimes involved. Each project consists of construction, health and training elements and are tailored to meet the needs of the community in which the project is undertaken.

Recent locations for AACAP have been Pukatja, South Australia (2010) and Fitzroy Crossing, Western Australia (2011). AACAP 2012 will be undertaken on the Dampier Peninsula.

Locations

AACAP projects have been undertaken at the following locations:

References

External links 
 

Australian military exercises